Jamila Gavin  (born 9 August 1941) is a British writer born in Mussoorie in the United Provinces of India, in the present-day state of Uttarakhand in the Western Himalayas. She is known mainly for children's books, including several with Indian contexts. Jamila Gavin is an author of children's books.

Life
Gavin was born in August 1941 in Mussoorie in the foothills of the Himalayas. Her Indian father and English mother had met as teachers in Iran. She learned to describe herself as "half and half". She says online that from her mixed background "I inherited two rich cultures which ran side by side throughout my life, and which always made me feel I belonged to both countries."

Gavin first visited England when she was six and settled there when she was 11. As an adult she worked in the music department of the BBC before becoming a writer. She wrote her first book, The Magic Orange Tree and Other Stories, in 1979. After her first child was born, she became aware that there were few children's books reflecting the experience of multi-racial children. She has also written books reflecting her childhood in India, particularly her Surya trilogy.

Gavin is a patron of the Shakespeare Schools Festival, a charity that allows schoolchildren across the UK to perform Shakespeare in professional theatres.

Gavin settled in Stroud, Gloucestershire before 1990 and was still living there in 2012. In 2016, she became one of the founders of the Stroud Book Festival, together with Cindy Jefferies.

Writer
The Surya trilogy – The Wheel of Surya (1992), The Eye of the Horse (1994) and The Track of the Wind (1997) – is a family saga that follows two generations of Indian Sikhs and shows the impact of the British Empire and the Partition of India on their lives. All three books made Guardian Children's Fiction Prize shortlists; The Wheel of Surya was special runner-up.

Coram Boy won the 2000 Whitbread Prize as Children's Book of the Year. It is set in the 18th century, being based on the Foundling Hospital established in London by sea Captain Thomas Coram. According to a local newspaper, the story "has links to Gloucestershire." Coram Boy has been adapted for the stage by Helen Edmundson and produced by the Royal National Theatre in 2005–2006, garnering Edmundson an Olivier Award. It also ran on Broadway in 2007.

Three Indian Goddesses and Three Indian Princesses are collections of short stories based around Indian legends. Nine other short stories were collected as The Magic Orange Tree and Other Stories.

Grandpa Chatterji is a series for younger children, named after its first book, which was adapted for television in 1997. Other books in the series are Grandpa Chatterji's Third Eye and Grandpa's Indian Summer. The first book made the Smarties Prize shortlist for reader ages 6–8.

Jamila Gavin has also written The Robber Baron's Daughter, Forbidden Memories, I Want to be An Angel, Kamla and Kate, Someone's Watching, Someone's Waiting, The Hideaway and The Wormholers.

Works

The Magic Orange Tree and other stories (1979)
Three Indian Princesses (1987)
The Singing Bowls (1989)
See No Evil (2008)
Grandpa Chatterji (1993)
Surya trilogy
The Wheel of Surya (Methuen, 1992) 
The Eye of the Horse (Methuen, 1994)
The Track of the Wind (Mammoth, 1997)
Grandpa's Indian Summer (1995)
The Wormholers (1996)
The Girl Who Rode on a Lion
The Temple by the Sea
The Lake of Stars
Our Favorite Stories (1997)
The Monkey in the Stars, self-adapted as a play for children, Monkeys in the Stars (2001)
Coram Boy (2000)  
Grandpa Chatterji's Third Eye (2006)
Fine Feathered Friend (1996)
Three Indian Goddesses (2001) 
Star Child On Clark Street
Danger By Moonlight (2002)
Out of India: Walking on My Hands
Out of India: An Anglo Indian Childhood (1997)
The Whistling Monster 
Celebration Stories, Coming Home
An Interview With Jamila Gavin 
From Out of the Shadows
The Blood Stone (2003)
The Robber Baron's Daughter
Deadly Friend (1994)
I Want to be An Angel (1990)
Forbidden Memories
Kamla and Kate (1983)
Kamla and Kate Again
Someone's Watching, Someone's Waiting
The Hideaway (1987)
Double Dare
Storyworlds (Heinemann, 1996), illustrated by Rhian Nest James
Grandma's Surprise
The Mango Tree
Presents 
Who Did It?
Digital Dan
Ali and the Robots (1986)
Stories From the Hindu World (1986)
The Bow of Shiva
The Turning Point
Alexander the Greatest (Walker, 2009), illustrated by Sumito Sakakibara
Fox
Derka Derb
Alexander the Great: Man, Myth, or Monster? (Walker, 2012), illustrated by David Parkins
The Paradise Carpet

Awards and honours
On 15 July 2014, she was announced as a finalist for the Neustadt Prize for Children's Literature.
She became a Fellow of the Royal Society of Literature in 2015.
Shortlisted for Richard Imison Memorial Award in 2001 
2000, Winner of Whitbread Children's Book Award (Costa Book Awards,) 
1997, Guardian Children's Fiction Prize, Shortlist 
1994, Guardian Children's Fiction Prize, Shortlist 
1992, Guardian Children's Fiction Prize, Shortlist

References

External links

Coram Boy at Royal National Theatre 
Stageworks: The National Theatre's educational website for Coram Boy 

1941 births
Living people
20th-century English novelists
20th-century English women writers
British women children's writers
English children's writers
English historical novelists
English women novelists
Fellows of the Royal Society of Literature
Indian emigrants to England
Indian people of English descent
People educated at Notting Hill & Ealing High School
People from Mussoorie
Writers from London